Burglary is a statutory offence in England and Wales.

In the three years to 2018 burglary reports in England and Wales rose by 6% while criminal charges for burglary fell by 33%.  The number of police officers available to investigate burglary and other crimes also fell during that time.

Statute
The offence of burglary is now defined by section 9 of the Theft Act 1968 which now reads:

Burglary with intent to rape

Section 9(2) originally referred to the offence of raping any woman in the building or part of the building in question. The words "raping any person" were substituted for the words "raping any woman" on 3 November 1994. This was consequential on the changes to the definition of rape made by the Criminal Justice and Public Order Act 1994. The words "or raping any person" were in turn repealed on 1 May 2004. The offence of burglary with intent to rape is replaced by the offence of trespassing with intent to commit a sexual offence, contrary to section 63 of the Sexual Offences Act 2003.

Amendments to ss 9(3) & (4)

Sections 9(3) and (4) were substituted on 1 October 1992.

Elements of the offence

"Enters"
Although physical evidence of entry is not normally difficult to obtain, it can be difficult on occasions to decide whether an entry has occurred in law. In R v Collins, it was held that entry had to be "substantial" and "effective". The issue arose in R v Brown (1985) 71 Cr App R 15 in which the defendant had been found on the pavement outside a shop with the top half of his body through the broken window, sorting through property on display for sale; this was held by the Court of Appeal to constitute an effective entry, while regarding the use of the word "substantial" as unnecessarily wide. It was ruled that the jury had been entitled to conclude that the entry had been effective. Furthermore, in R v Ryan (1996) 160 JP 610, the defendant had been found partially within a building, having been trapped by a window, and argued that this was not a sufficient entry. However, he was convicted as it was held that a partial entry was sufficient and that it was irrelevant that he was due to circumstances incapable of stealing anything.

"Building or part of a building"
The Theft Act 1968 does not define a building, so this must be a matter of fact for the jury, however, Section 9(4) specifically states that the term includes an "inhabited vehicle or vessel"; hence motor homes, caravans and houseboats are protected by the section even when temporarily unoccupied.
Burglary can also be committed in "part of a building" and in R v Walkington 1979 1 WLR 1169 the defendant had entered a large shop during trading hours but went behind a counter and put his hand in an empty till. The court held that he had entered that part of the building normally reserved for staff as a trespasser with intention to steal money and was therefore guilty of burglary.

"As a trespasser"
The essence of trespass is entering or remaining in another's property without authority; a person having permission to enter property for one purpose who in fact enters for another purpose may become a trespasser, and in R v Jones and Smith, a defendant who had a general permission to enter his father's home became a trespasser when he did so in order to steal a television set, because doing so was inconsistent with the general permission. In recent years, the terms "distraction burglary", "artifice burglary" and "burglary by trick" have been used in crime prevention circles when access to premises is granted as a result of some deception on the occupier, usually by a pretence that the burglar represents some body who might reasonably request access such as a water, gas or electricity supplier. There is no separate legal definition of this variant.

"With intent"
The intention to commit an offence (theft, grievous bodily harm or, for s9(1)(a), criminal damage), being an essential element of burglary, requires proof beyond reasonable doubt. For example, if entry is made to regain property which the defendant honestly believes he has a legal right to take, there is no intention to steal and the defendant is entitled to be acquitted. However, it has been held that a conditional intent to steal anything found to be of value is enough to satisfy this requirement.

Mens Rea
R v Collins is authority for the proposition that the defendant must at least be reckless as to whether his entry is a trespass. For the Section 9(1)(a) offence, proof beyond reasonable doubt is required that the defendant intended to commit the offence specified as part of the burglary. In the Section 9(1)(b) offence, the mens rea is that of the offence committed, such that, for example, if grievous bodily harm is inflicted, recklessness will be sufficient to establish liability.

Mode of trial
Subject to the following exceptions, the offence of burglary is triable either way.

Burglary comprising the commission of, or an intention to commit, an offence which is triable only on indictment, is triable only on indictment.

Burglary in a dwelling is triable only on indictment if any person in the dwelling was subjected to violence or the threat of violence.

Sentence

Maximum

Section 9(3) of the Theft Act 1968, as substituted by section 26(2) of the Criminal Justice Act 1991, provides that:

The reference in that section to a building which is a dwelling, applies also to an inhabited vehicle or vessel, and applies to any such vehicle or vessel at times when the person having a habitation in it is not there as well as at times when he is.

A person guilty of burglary is liable on summary conviction to imprisonment for a term not exceeding six months, or to a fine not exceeding the prescribed sum, or to both.

Minimum

Section 4 of the Crime (Sentences) Act 1997 specified a minimum 3-year prison sentence for third-time domestic burglary unless exceptional circumstances applied. That section is replaced by section 111 of the Powers of Criminal Courts (Sentencing) Act 2000.

Authorities

Higher courts have consistently upheld lengthy custodial sentences for burglaries of dwellings; see, for example R v Brewster 1998 1 Cr App R (S) 181

Aggravated burglary
Under section 10, aggravated burglary is committed when a burglar enters and "at the time has with him a firearm, imitation firearm, weapon of offence, or any explosive".

"Has with him"
In R v Kelt [1977] 65 Cr App R 74 it was held that this phrase will normally mean "carrying", and in R v Klass 162 JP 105, The Times, 17 December 1997 (CA) others had entered a building for criminal purposes while the defendant remained outside, but in possession of a scaffolding pole which had been used to break a window. This did not, in law, constitute an entry for the purposes of burglary. It was held that since Klass had not himself entered the building, he was guilty of burglary and not aggravated burglary.

"At the time"
In R v O'Leary 1986 82 Cr App R 337, the defendant entered a house unarmed but picked up a kitchen knife once inside; he then used it to force the occupier to hand over property. It was held that this constituted aggravated burglary because the offence which was part of the enterprise had been committed while in possession of the weapon.
In R v Kelly, 1992 The Times, 2 December, the defendant had used a screwdriver to gain entry; once inside the premises, he was confronted by the occupiers and used the screwdriver as a weapon to force them to hand over a video recorder. It was held that the screwdriver became an offensive weapon when he formed an intention to use it for causing injury to the occupier at the time of the theft, and therefore he was guilty of aggravated burglary.

Mens Rea
A plea that the defendant did not intend to use the weapon is not a defence to this charge (R v Stones [1989] 1 WLR 156).

Mode of trial and sentence
Aggravated burglary is an indictable-only offence. It is punishable with imprisonment for life or for any shorter term.

History
Sections 9 and 10 of the Theft Act 1968 replace sections 24 to 27 and 28(4) of the Larceny Act 1916.

Section 24 created the offence of sacrilege.

Section 25 created the offence of burglary.

Section 26 created an offence described by its marginal note as "housebreaking and committing felony" (it could be committed in respect of buildings other than dwelling-houses and at the time of its repeal it consisted of committing an arrestable offence).

Section 27 created an offence described by its marginal note as "housebreaking with intent to commit felony" (and see the words in parentheses above).

At the time of its repeal, section 28(4) created offence of being found by night in any building with intent to commit any arrestable offence (previously felony) therein.

Sections 51 and 52 of the Larceny Act 1861 related to burglary.

Notes

Robbery
English criminal law